The Turbio River flows from the Cordillera Domeyko and is an affluent of the Jorquera River which is an affluent of the Copiapó River in the Coquimbo Region of Chile.

References

Rivers of Chile
Rivers of Coquimbo Region